Vitaliy Yuriyovych Khomutynnik (born 4 August 1976) is a Ukrainian oligarch. He is a former head of the Renaissance Party, a pro-Russia political party.

From 2002 until 2019 he was a member of the Verkhovna Rada (Ukrainian Parliament). During his tenure, Khomutynnik has been accused of evading taxes and corruption. In 2017, Die Zeit described him as a "corrupt politician".

Early life and education 
Born on August 4, 1976 in Makiivka, Donetsk region. He graduated from the Donetsk State Academy of Management in the field of finance and credit. Second higher education received at the Yaroslav of the Wise National Law Academy of Ukraine.

Career

Business career 
Khomutynnik started his first business, a private company Cascade in 1993. Since then, by developing and investing into fast-growing spheres of Ukrainian economy, a private company was transformed into operating now as Cascade Investment Fund. The primary focus of Cascade Investment Fund is investment in the agricultural sector, finance, gas extraction and real estate business in Ukraine. Also has office in London. Today, in the investment fund portfolio not only private equity companies but also shareholdings in public companies, such as biggest Ukrainian agricultural holding Kernel Holding or gas extraction company JKX Oil & Gas.

Khomutynnik is a business partner along with Pavel Fuks in a Ukrainian gas company called Ukrnaftoburinnya, usually associated with Ihor Kolomoyskyi. In 2017, Ukrnaftoburinnya's volumes of production were around 390 million cubic meters of natural gas. Khomutynnik owns shares in Ukrnaftoburinnya through a Cypriot-domiciled company, Deripon Commercial.

In 2019, Khomutynnik acquired a stake in Dmitry Firtash's Dresdenco Investments, after an approval by Antimonopoly Committee of Ukraine. Khomutynnik being a business partner of oligarch Dmitry Firtash, who is wanted by the US federal government.

Khomutynnik is also the owner of an insurance company, Brokbusiness.

Political career 
Khomutynnik was elected to the Parliament for the first time by majority district in his native city Makiivka (Donetsk Region) in 2002. During his early career, he founded the youth wing of Party of Regions (PR) and later handed its control to Viktor Viktorovych Yanukovych. Later, he was elected to the Verkhovna Rada (Ukrainian Parliament) in 2002, 2006, 2007, and 2012. During this time, he was a head of Committee on Taxation and Customs Policy and head of Committee on Financial Policy and Banking and controlled taxation and VAT refunds.

In 2012, he was elected for the Party of Regions, as number 23 of its party list.

In 2014, Khomutynnik was elected to the 8th Ukrainian Verkhovna Rada in the Ukrainian parliamentary election by winning a majority district in Kharkiv. This time as an independent candidate, he was elected in Kharkiv's Frunzensky District with 30.34% of the votes, Inna Chuiko of People's Front placed second with 23.27% of the votes. In 2014, he was considered as the wealthiest and youngest MP and was a close associate of Viktor Yanukovych. During his time as a member of parliament, Khomutynnik created a pressure group with around ten MPs, termed as "Khomutynnik group" in Wilson Center report, that was created to support Ihor Kolomoyskyi in the parliament. He was one of the MPs who voted for dictatorial laws on January 16, 2014. 

In 2017, Khomutynnik and his accompanied Russian-Ukrainian oligarch Pavel Fuks, known as his business partner, in the United States, in an attempt to attend inaugural events.

In the 2019 Ukrainian parliamentary election Khomutynnik lost his parliamentary seat. He was a candidate of Opposition Bloc (he was placed number 11 on their national election list).

In October 2019 he was elected president and chairman of the board of the Ukrainian Golf Federation.

Wealth 
Khomutynnik is the owner of a Cyprus-domiciled offshore company, Cacique Limited, that operates subsidiary companies in Ukraine, including Nyva LLC, Agrosvit PAE, PE Chervonyans`ki agrarian investments, PE Koropski agrarian investments, PE Sosnyts`ki agrarni investytsii, and PE Zasullya-5. Another Cyprus-domiciled offshore company, Deripon Commercial, is owned by him in equal parts with Ihor Kolomoisky, that owns PJSC Ukrnaftoburinnia, a gas field in Ukraine.

Khomutynnik acquired a luxury yacht, Apostrophe, from Moran Yacht & Ship company in 2014 for $24 million. The yacht is registered in the Cayman Islands.

According to the annual ratings of Forbes Ukraine and Focus Ukraine magazines, Khomutynnik is included in the top 20 richest people in Ukraine. In April 2019, the magazine Focus estimated his wealth at $470 million.

Personal life 
He and his wife, Svetlana, have a son and a daughter.

References

External link

1976 births
Living people
Ukrainian oligarchs
People from Makiivka
Fourth convocation members of the Verkhovna Rada
Fifth convocation members of the Verkhovna Rada
Sixth convocation members of the Verkhovna Rada
Seventh convocation members of the Verkhovna Rada
Eighth convocation members of the Verkhovna Rada
Party of Regions politicians
Revival (Ukraine) politicians
Recipients of the Honorary Diploma of the Cabinet of Ministers of Ukraine